Donald Suluk (alternately Sulutnar, born approximately 1925, Chesterfield Inlet, Nunavut-?) was an Inuit religious figure who preached a syncretic form of Christianity in Nunavut in the 1940s.

Suluk promoted practices such as the use of crucifixes, but also heterodox practices such as using his dog to make people confess.

References

Sources
Aparecida Vilaça, Robin Wright. Native Christians: Modes and Effects of Christianity Among Indigenous Peoples of the Americas. Ashgate Publishing, Ltd., 2009 , 978-0-7546-6355-3

Inuit missionaries
Inuit from the Northwest Territories
Year of death missing
Year of birth missing
Canadian Christian missionaries
Christian missionaries in Canada
People from Chesterfield Inlet